The 2015 BBL Champions Cup was a basketball game that was held on 27 September 2015. 2014–15 Basketball Bundesliga champions Brose Baskets faced off against 2015 BBL-Pokal winners EWE Baskets Oldenburg in the Brose Arena in Bamberg.

Match

BBL Champions Cup
Champions Cup